Metanarsia trisignella is a moth of the family Gelechiidae. It is found in Uzbekistan, Turkmenistan and south-eastern Kazakhstan.

The wingspan is 10–14 mm. The costal margin of the forewings is mottled with brown. The hindwings are grey. Adults are on wing from April to June.

References

Moths described in 2008
Metanarsia